Frank Duval (born 22 November 1940, Berlin, as Frank Uwe Patz) is a German composer, conductor, record producer, songwriter and singer.

Life
Born into a family of artists, Duval studied as an actor and dancer, and also sang with his sister, Maria. By the 1960s, Duval was composing music, both orchestral and pop, and his first soundtrack, for an episode of the German serial Tatort, was broadcast in 1977. The song "Todesengel" from his 1979 debut album, Die schönsten Melodien aus Derrick und Der Alte, became a moderate hit, and was a number one in Switzerland in 1979.

During the 1980s, Duval released several soundtracks, as well as solo albums, with lyrics occasionally co-written with his wife Kalina Maloyer. He had several singles enter the German charts, including "Angel of Mine" (Number One in 1981), "Ways" (1983), "Lovers Will Survive" (1986), and "When You Were Mine" (1987).

Duval wrote songs for Ivan Rebroff, Alexandra, Karin Huebner, Margot Werner, Klaus Löwitsch, and Maria Schell.

Discography

As Frank Duval

Studio albums

Compilation albums 

 Die grössten Erfolge (1985)
 Greatest Hits (1986)
 Frank Duval (1988)
 Seine grössten Erfolge (1989)
 Derrick Forever (2000)
 Angel of Mine (2001)
 Spuren (2001) (3 CD-box)
 Colour Collection (2006)

Singles

References

External links

Frank Duval Website 
Frank Duval Foundation 
Frank Duval at Magazine-Music 
Frank Duval Bio part 1 
Frank Duval Bio part 2 

1940 births
German film score composers
Male film score composers
German male composers
Living people
Musicians from Berlin
German pop singers